John Wilford Blackstone Jr. (December 22, 1835October 22, 1911) was an American farmer, lawyer, politician, and judge.  A Republican, he represented Lafayette County for one term each in the Wisconsin State Senate and Assembly. He also served two four-year terms as County Judge for Lafayette County.

Biography
Born in White Oak Springs (then part of the Michigan Territory) Blackstone read law with John K. Williams and was admitted to the State Bar of Wisconsin in 1861. He was elected County Judge in Lafayette County that year, commencing his term in January 1862.  He served two terms before losing re-election in 1868. In 1873, he returned to office as District Attorney.

He served in the Wisconsin State Assembly in the 1879 session and in the Wisconsin State Senate for the 1880 and 1881 sessions. He also worked as an agent of the Bureau of Pensions for three years.  Later in life, he moved to Minneapolis, Minnesota, where his daughter, Roccey, resided. He died there in 1911.

Personal life and family
Blackstone is a direct descendant of William Blaxton (Blackstone), one of the first colonists of the Plymouth Colony, and the first English resident at Boston (1623) and Rhode Island (1635). The name "Blackstone" appears on many landmarks of New England due to his noteworthy ancestor.

His father was John Wilford Blackstone, Sr., one of the early pioneers of Lafayette County, who served in the Wisconsin Territorial Legislature and was a judge for Iowa County during the time it was organized under the Michigan Territory.

John W. Blackstone Jr. married Ellen E. Hardy, of Platteville, Wisconsin, on June 20, 1862.  They had at least four children:
 Roccey, who married and moved to Minneapolis
 Jessie, who became principal of the Prescott School in Anaconda, Montana
 John III, who became editor and publisher of the Southwestern Local in Shullsburg
 Ralph, who became a freight conductor on the Chicago, Milwaukee, and St. Paul Railroad

References

External links
 

1835 births
1911 deaths
People from Lafayette County, Wisconsin
Wisconsin lawyers
Wisconsin state court judges
Members of the Wisconsin State Assembly
Wisconsin state senators
19th-century American judges
19th-century American lawyers